Irrawang High School is a government-funded co-educational secondary day school, located on Mount Hall Road, Raymond Terrace, in the Port Stephens region of New South Wales, Australia.  

Established in 1983, the school has a teaching staff of 80 and enrolled approximately 830 students in 2018, from Year 7 to Year 12, of whom 17 percent identified as Indigenous Australians and four percent were from a language background other than English. The school is operated by the NSW Department of Education; the principal is Nicole Huxley.

One of two public secondary schools in the area, the school draws students from Raymond Terrace, Medowie and other outlying areas.

Notable Attendees 
Justin Blair 

Rehaan Uddin

See also 

 List of government schools in New South Wales
 Hunter River High School
 Education in Australia

References

External links 
 
 NSW Schools website

Public high schools in New South Wales
Educational institutions established in 1983
Mid North Coast
1983 establishments in Australia